Maripipi, officially the Municipality of Maripipi, is a 5th class municipality in the province of Biliran, Philippines. According to the 2020 census, it has a population of 6,373 people. The town's populace predominantly speak Waray language.

Geography
Maripipi Municipality is composed of Maripipi Island and surrounding islets situated northwest off the coast of Biliran Island.

According to the Philippine Statistics Authority, the municipality has a land area of  constituting  of the  total area of Biliran.

Barangays
Maripipi is politically subdivided into 15 barangays.

Climate

Demographics

In the 2020 census, Maripipi had a population of 6,373.

Economy

References

External links

 [ Philippine Standard Geographic Code]

Municipalities of Biliran
Islands of Biliran
Island municipalities in the Philippines